Malky may refer to:

 Malky (Dune), fictional character in novel God Emperor of Dune
 Malky /  Malkie, shortening of the female name Malcah, Hebrew for "queen"
 Malky, shortening of Malcolm (given name)
 Malky, name given to members of the mantis family Mantidae
 Malky/Malkie, slang term originating from Glasgow and the West coast of Scotland, used to describe slashing someone with an open razor. Comes from the rhyming slang Malcolm (Malky) Fraser (Razor)